Buttress was built in 1940 as the relief landing field for RCAF Station Moose Jaw and Royal Air Force's, No. 32 Service Flying Training School that was stationed there. These fields were used for practice circuits and also as an emergency alternate landing field.

The Buttress Post Office opened on July 1, 1909 and closed on July 31, 1961.

Aerodrome 
The relief field was constructed in the typical triangular pattern and had three runways, listed as follows:

Today the aerodrome is abandoned but the telltale British Commonwealth Air Training Plan triangle of runways is still visible from the air.

A review of Google Maps in June 2018 shows a clear outline of the former triangular airfield and the coordinates stated above appear to be correct.

See also 
 List of airports in Saskatchewan
 List of defunct airports in Canada

References 

Airports of the British Commonwealth Air Training Plan
Baildon No. 131, Saskatchewan
Defunct airports in Saskatchewan
Royal Canadian Air Force stations
Military history of Saskatchewan
Military airbases in Saskatchewan